Anatoly Kuzmin is a former international speedway rider from the Soviet Union.

Speedway career 
Kuzmin reached the final of the Speedway World Championship in the 1972 Individual Speedway World Championship. He was one of six Russians that competed in the 1972 World final after strong performances in the Continental final and European final.

World final appearances

Individual World Championship
 1972 –  London, Wembley Stadium – 12th – 4pts

World Pairs Championship
 1973 -  Borås (with Vladimir Gordeev) - 4th - 20pts

World Team Cup
 1971 -  Wroclaw, Olympic Stadium (with Vladimir Smirnov / Vladimir Gordeev / Viktor Trofimov / Grigory Khlinovsky) - 2nd - 22pts (3)
 1972 -  Olching, (with Viktor Trofimov / Grigory Khlinovsky / Viktor Kalmykov) - 2nd - 21 + 7pts (6 +2)
 1974 -  Chorzów, Stadion Śląski, Chorzów (with Valery Gordeev / Mikhail Krasnov / Viktor Kalmykov) - 4th - 10pts (0)

References 

Russian speedway riders
Living people
Year of birth missing (living people)